U-11 may refer to one of the following German submarines:

 , was a Type U 9 submarine launched in 1911 and that served in the First World War until sunk on 9 December 1914
 During the First World War, Germany also had these submarines with similar names:
 , a Type UB I submarine launched in 1915 and stricken on 19 February 1919
 , a Type UC I submarine launched in 1915 and sunk 26 June 1918
 , a Type IIB submarine that served in the Second World War and was stricken on 5 January 1945; scuttled 2 May 1945
 , a Type 205 submarine of the Bundesmarine that was launched in 1968; decommissioned in 2003; now a museum ship in Burgstaaken, Fehmarn

U-11 or U-XI may also refer to:
 , a U-10 class submarine of the Austro-Hungarian Navy

Submarines of Germany